Obiri Yeboah Kyei (born 3 December 1994) is an Australian-British professional basketball player. He last played for the Logan Thunder of NBL1 North. He played college basketball for NCAA Division II schools Metro State and Eckerd College.

Basketball career
On 21 May 2019, Kyei signed a two-year deal with the Adelaide 36ers of the Australian National Basketball League (NBL). He averaged 3.3 points and 4.2 rebounds in 28 games played for the team. On 29 September 2020, he was granted a release by the 36ers to pursue business interests and announced his retirement from basketball. The extended off-season before the 2020–21 NBL season enabled him to pursue other interests and he planned to diversify his career.

On 21 June 2021, Kyei joined the Logan Thunder of NBL1 North for the remainder of the 2021 season. He averaged 11.2 points and 10.2 rebounds per game in 5 games played.

Fashion career
Kyei creates sustainable fashion for his label Obiri using vintage clothes and deadstock fabrics to produce new clothing. He fronted the campaign for Champion Australia's sustainable Re:Bound collection in 2021.

Personal life
Kyei was born in Australia to a Ghanaian father.

References

1994 births
Living people
Adelaide 36ers players
Australian expatriate basketball people in Germany
Australian expatriate basketball people in Spain
Australian expatriate basketball people in the United States
Australian men's basketball players
Australian people of Ghanaian descent
Basketball players from Sydney
British men's basketball players
Centers (basketball)
Eckerd Tritons men's basketball players
English men's basketball players
Metro State Roadrunners men's basketball players
Força Lleida CE players